The University of Montenegro Faculty for Sport and Physical Education (Montenegrin: Fakultet za sport i fizičko vaspitanje Univerziteta Crne Gore Факултет за спорт и физичко васпитање Универзитета Црне Горе) is one of the educational institutions of the University of Montenegro. Its building is located in Nikšić.

History 

The Department for Physical Culture existed in Nikšić since 1963, as part of the Teaching Faculty (later Faculty of Philosophy). In the academic year 2008/2009, the Faculty for Sport and Physical Culture was officially opened.

Organization 

Undergraduate studies are organized at the Faculty on the following study programs:
Physical Culture
Education of Sport Journalists
Education of Coaches

Postgraduate specialist and master studies are organized for the study program Physical Culture.

References 

Sport
Montenegro
Faculty for Sport and Physical Education
Sports universities and colleges
2008 establishments in Montenegro